Beagle is a station on the Pittsburgh Regional Transit's light rail network, located in Bethel Park, Pennsylvania. The street level stop is designed as a small commuter stop, serving area residents who walk to the train so they can be taken toward Downtown Pittsburgh.

References

External links

Station from Beagle Drive from Google Maps Street View

Port Authority of Allegheny County stations
Railway stations in the United States opened in 1987
Silver Line (Pittsburgh)